Swieciny may refer to:
Świeciny, Łódź Voivodeship, Poland
Święciny, Opole Voivodeship, Poland